The 2023 Oyo State gubernatorial election will take place on 18 March 2023, to elect the Governor of Oyo State, concurrent with elections to the Oyo State House of Assembly as well as twenty-seven other gubernatorial elections and elections to all other state houses of assembly. The election—which was postponed from its original 11 March date—will be held three weeks after the presidential election and National Assembly elections. Incumbent PDP Governor Seyi Makinde was re-elected, winning by a % margin of victory over first runner-up and APC nominee—Senator Teslim Folarin.

The primaries, scheduled for between 4 April and 9 June 2022, resulted in Makinde being renominated by the Peoples Democratic Party by a wide margin on 25 May while the All Progressives Congress nominated Folarin—Senator for Oyo Central—on 26 May. The next month, Adebayo Adelabu—the runner-up in the APC primary—obtained the Accord nomination.

Electoral system
The Governor of Oyo State is elected using a modified two-round system. To be elected in the first round, a candidate must receive the plurality of the vote and over 25% of the vote in at least two-thirds of state local government areas. If no candidate passes this threshold, a second round will be held between the top candidate and the next candidate to have received a plurality of votes in the highest number of local government areas.

Background
Oyo State is a large, Yoruba-majority southwestern state; the state has vast agricultural and service sectors but it faces large security issues from both inter-ethnic violence and conflict between herders and farmers along with a large number of out-of-school children.

Politically, the 2019 elections in the state were categorized as a large swing towards the PDP as the party's presidential nominee Atiku Abubakar narrowly won the state after Buhari had won it in 2015, Makinde won the gubernatorial race by 17% of the vote, and the PDP gained a majority in the House of Assembly. For the Senate, the APC won back two Senate seats it lost through defections while the PDP gained a APC-held seat; in the House of Representatives, the APC won the majority of the seats.

Ahead of his term, Makinde's inauguration speech focused on ease of doing business, fighting poverty, education, agricultural development, disability rights, and healthcare. In terms of his performance, Makinde was commended for a productive first 100 days, investing heavily in educational development, establishing the Oyo State Anti-Corruption Agency, and confirming that Muslim students could wear hijabs in school. However, he was criticized for poor initial responses to the COVID-19 pandemic and October 2020 End SARS protests along with proposed handing over of Government College, Ibadan to the alumni association.

Primary elections
The primaries, along with any potential challenges to primary results, were to take place between 4 April and 3 June 2022 but the deadline was extended to 9 June.

All Progressives Congress 
Analysts viewed the APC gubernatorial primary as a likely contest between the preexisting major factions within the Oyo State APC, namely: the faction led by Oyo Central Senator Teslim Folarin and the Unity Forum which was backed by most other major state APC politicians including Oyo North Senator Abdulfatai Buhari and 2019 APC nominee Adebayo Adelabu. Tensions between the factions reached a head days before the APC national convention in March 2022 when the Unity Forum held a parallel party congress and elected separate leadership to the Folarin-supported bloc's congress; although the national party ended up accepting the congress by Folarin's faction, tensions continued until an April reconciliation process between Buhari and Folarin which ended in a truce where Buhari dropped out of the gubernatorial race and Folarin supported Buhari's return bid to the senate.

Pre-primary analysis said the race was between the groups backing Folarin and Adelabu. Hours before the primary's scheduled start, the primary committee abruptly postponed the election until 27 May due to "an influx of non-delegates into the venue and security reasons." The next day, the candidates contested an indirect primary that ended in a win for Folarin after results showed him gaining just over 73% of the delegates' votes. In his acceptance speech, Folarin vowed to save the state from the "maladministration of the PDP-led government" and thanked delegates. However, the internal party crisis did not end as Adelabu—the first runner-up who did not attend the primary—labeled the primary as a "charade" and left the party for Accord.

Nominated 
 Teslim Folarin: Senator for Oyo Central (2003–2011; 2019–present) and 2015 PDP gubernatorial nominee
 Running mate—David Oluwafemi Okunlola: lecturer

Eliminated in primary 
 Azeez Adeduntan: former Commissioner of Health
 Adebayo Adelabu: 2019 APC gubernatorial nominee and former CBN Deputy Governor of Operations (2014–2018) (defected after to the primary to run in the Accord gubernatorial primary)
 Akeem Agbaje: barrister
 Adeolu Akande: Chairman of the Nigerian Communications Commission (2020–present) and former Chief of Staff to Governor Abiola Ajimobi
 Oyedele Hakeem Alao: 2019 AD gubernatorial nominee

Withdrew 
 Adeniyi Akintola: former House of Assembly member and husband of state High Court judge Rachael Boyede Akintola
 Abdulfatai Buhari: Senator for Oyo North (2015–present) and former House of Representatives member for Ogbomoso North/Ogbomoso South/Orire (2003–2007) (to run for senator for Oyo North)
 Abisoye Fagade: businessman (to run for senator for Oyo Central)
 Joseph Olasunkanmi Tegbe: 2019 APC gubernatorial candidate (defected to the PDP prior to the primary to run for senator for Oyo Central)

Declined 
 Abdur-Raheem Adebayo Shittu: former Minister of Communications (2015–2019), 2015 and 2019 APC gubernatorial candidate, former Commissioner for Justice and Attorney General, and former House of Assembly member

Results

People's Democratic Party 
Despite rumors about a potential presidential campaign, Makinde declined to contest for the presidency and instead announced his campaign for re-election to the office of governor; analysts state that he is the prohibitive favorite in the PDP gubernatorial primary. However, the Oyo PDP underwent a series of internal disputes ahead of the election with the most major one being over Makinde's control of the state party and his "consensus" picks for various nominations. Another issue was the break between Makinde and his deputy, Rauf Olaniyan; while Olaniyan ruled out a gubernatorial run in 2020, he lamented being sidelined and openly spoke about defecting to another party by early 2022.

Ahead of the primary, observers predicted an easy Makinde victory. On the date of the primary, the exercise held peacefully at Lekan Salami Stadium in Ibadan and ended with Makinde defeating his sole challenger, former Deputy Governor Hazeem Gbolarumi, by a massive margin: 1,040 to 2. Before the primary, Gbolarumi claimed that his supporters were chased from the venue and after the vote, he rejected the results. After the primary, Makinde dropped Olaniyan as his running mate by picking former state Attorney-General Bayo Lawal instead on 7 June; a few days later Olaniyan decamped to the APC. On 18 July, Olaniyan was removed from office by the House of Assembly with Lawal being nominated and confirmed in his place.

Nominated 
 Seyi Makinde: Governor (2019–present) and 2015 SDP gubernatorial nominee
Running mate—Bayo Lawal: Deputy Governor (2022–present) and former state Attorney-General

Eliminated in primary 
 Hazeem Gbolarumi: former Deputy Governor (2007–2011)

Withdrew 
 Joshua Olukayode Popoola: engineer (defected prior to the primary to successfully run in the NNPP gubernatorial primary)

Declined 
 Rauf Olaniyan: former Deputy Governor (2019–2022)

Results

Minor parties 

 Adebayo Adelabu (Accord)
Running mate: Abiodun Ayanfemi Ayandele
 Lateef Olaniyi Ajekiigbe (Action Alliance)
Running mate: Ajiboye Taofeek Fawole
 Akim Adebola Yusuf (Action Democratic Party)
Running mate: Adigun Modupe Daniels
 Yinusa Kazeem Ayandoye (Action Peoples Party)
Running mate: Christopher Oyeniyi Olanipekun
 Mojeed Okedara (African Action Congress)
Running mate: Oladimeji Idowu Ayomide
 Ghaniyu Bamidele Ajadi (African Democratic Congress)
Running mate: Emmanuel Oyetayo Oyewole
 Adeyemi Oluwaseye Adeniran (Allied Peoples Movement)
Running mate: Emmanuel Adekanmi Adewale
 Adeshina Adewole (All Progressives Grand Alliance)
Running mate: John Oladejo Oladepo
 Okunade Tunde Adeyemi (Boot Party)
Running mate: Haleemat Omobola Adeleke
 Tawfiq Tayo Akinwale (Labour Party)
Running mate: Esther Adebimpe Akanji
 Joshua Olukayode Popoola (New Nigeria Peoples Party)
Running mate: Modinat Adesope
 Raymond Adegboyega (National Rescue Movement)
Running mate: Adetunji Adeyemi Adedimeji
 Michael Lana (Social Democratic Party)
Running mate: Abdur-Rahman Aloyinlapa
 Aduragbemi Euba (Young Progressives Party)
Running mate: Jeleel Ojewole

Campaign
Immediately after the primaries in June 2022, observers stated that Makinde and Folarin were focusing on unifying their respective parties. PDP members aggrieved by Makinde's allegedly 'exclusionist' leadership style began to be viewed as a potential liability for Makinde by pundits while analysts also noted that Ezenwo Nyesom Wike–an ally of Makinde–losing the PDP presidential primary might lead to less out-of-state internal party support for Makinde's campaign. Another potential problem for Makinde was his attempts to impeach his Olaniyan for decamping to the APC. Folarin also faced issues with defections as several high-profile party members (including primary runner-up Adebayo Adelabu) switched to Accord or the New Nigeria Peoples Party; in response, the party formed a peace and reconciliation committee. By August and September, the APC reconciliation process had proceeded but the party continued to fear further loss of support, especially from the relatives of late former Governor Abiola Ajimobi as more losing gubernatorial candidates refused to back Folarin; similarly, Makinde's issues with the national PDP continued into the month as well.

Pundits noted that regional unity, not just party unity, would also be required for successful campaigns. Candidates from outside the city of Ibadan, which has produced six of seven elected governors, were passed over for major party nominations as both Folarin and Makinde are from the city. The oft-lamented dominance of Ibadan on Oyo State politics due to its numerical advantage sparked resentment; both major parties were expected to select deputy nominees from outside the city to balance their tickets, both major candidates followed the expectation with Makinde picking Kisi-native Bayo Lawal and Folarin selecting Shaki-native David Oluwafemi Okunlola.

Later in 2022, Makinde continued his disputes with the national PDP by aligning with the Wike-led Integrity Group against the party's presidential nominee—Atiku Abubakar. By December, reports that the Integrity Group planned to endorse a different party's presidential nominee purportedly led the PDP to threaten the group with expulsion. Amid the turmoil, analysts noted that the dispute could greatly affect Makinde's re-election chances as Abubakar allies within the Oyo PDP could support Folarin to remove an intra-party rival. However, Folarin continued to face similar internal problems as reporting revealed that former state First Lady Florence Ajimobi was supporting Adebayo Adelabu (A) while several other Oyo APC figures (Minister Sunday Akin Dare, former Minister Abdur-Raheem Adebayo Shittu) did not actively campaign for Folarin. Perhaps most importantly, APC presidential nominee Bola Tinubu also allegedly did not support Folarin by January 2023.

By 2023, attention largely switched to the presidential election on 25 February. In the election, Oyo State voted for Bola Tinubu (APC); Tinubu won 55.6% of the vote to defeat Atiku Abubakar (PDP) at 22.6% and Peter Obi (LP) at 12.2%. Although the result was unsurprising as Oyo is in Tinubu's southwestern base and projections had favored him, the totals led to increased pressure on the Makinde campaign due to Tinubu's wide margin of victory and APC downballot successes. Gubernatorial campaign analysis in the wake of the presidential election noted that Makinde's (alleged) tacit support for Tinubu may inadvertently hurt his own campaign as the move galvanized APC supporters while alienating Abubakar-supporting PDP voters. However, other punditry pointed out intra-APC divides in addition to the resurfacing of Folarin's murder charge from the 2010 NURTW crisis.

Projections

Conduct

Electoral timetable

General election

Results

By senatorial district 
The results of the election by senatorial district.

By federal constituency
The results of the election by federal constituency.

By local government area 
The results of the election by local government area.

See also 
 2023 Nigerian elections
 2023 Nigerian gubernatorial elections

Notes

References 

Oyo State gubernatorial election
2023
gubernatorial
Oyo